Laura Smith may refer to:
Laura Smith (singer) (1952–2020), Canadian folk singer-songwriter
Laura Smith (blues singer), American blues singer
Laura Smith (British politician), British politician
Laura Smith (Canadian politician), Canadian politician
Laura Alexandrine Smith, English musician and ethnomusicologist
Laura-Lee Smith, New Zealand table tennis player
Laura Smith Haviland, American abolitionist, suffragette, and social reformer

See also

Lauren Smith (disambiguation)
Laurie Smith, sheriff
Laura Smyth, Australian politician